Sir John Barran, 1st Baronet (3 August 1821 – 3 May 1905) was a British clothing manufacturer and Liberal Party politician.

Public life

Barran was the elder surviving son of a London gunsmith, John Barran, and his wife, Elizabeth (née Fletcher). 

Barran founded the firm of John Barran and Sons, clothing manufacturers, of Leeds. He was a Justice of the Peace for Leeds and the West Riding of Yorkshire and served as Mayor of Leeds from 1870 to 1871. In 1876, he was returned to Parliament as one of three representatives for Leeds, a seat he held until 1885, and later sat for Otley from 1886 to 1895, when he was created a baronet, of Chapel Allerton Hall in Chapel Allerton in the West Riding of the County of York and Queen's Gate, St Mary Abbots parish, in Kensington in the County of London.

Family life
Barran married Ann Hirst (died 1874) in 1842. He married secondly, to Eliza Bilton, née Brown, in 1878. He had six sons and four daughters. One of his son's died young. His youngest son, Rowland, became a Member of Parliament. 

Barran died in May 1905, aged 83, and was succeeded in the baronetcy by his grandson John, his eldest son John Barran having predeceased him. Barran was buried in Beckett Street Cemetery in Leeds.

Clothing manufacture

John Barran was a pioneer in the manufacture of ready-to-wear clothing. He moved to Leeds in 1842, and soon opened his own tailoring shop at 30 Bridge End South. By 1851, he had moved to Briggate and, in 1856, he had a factory with 20-30 sewing machines. After seeing a bandsaw being used to cut wood veneers in 1858 he introduced its use for cutting cloth, a major innovation. By the 1870s he had 2,000 machines, and in 1904 he employed 3,000 people.

His son Charles took over as chairman of the company in 1903, and another son Rowland became chairman in 1918.

St Pauls House, Leeds in Park Square, Leeds was built as a warehouse for Barran in 1878. It was designed by Thomas Ambler, and is in Moorish style.

Artistic recognition
His bust was sculpted by Joseph Gott, son of his rival Benjamin Gott. It is in Leeds Art Gallery.

Notes

References

Kidd, Charles, Williamson, David (editors). Debrett's Peerage and Baronetage (1990 edition). New York: St Martin's Press, 1990,

External links 
 

1821 births
1905 deaths
Businesspeople from Leeds
Baronets in the Baronetage of the United Kingdom
Liberal Party (UK) MPs for English constituencies
UK MPs 1874–1880
UK MPs 1880–1885
UK MPs 1886–1892
UK MPs 1892–1895
Mayors of Leeds
19th-century English businesspeople
English justices of the peace